The Ohio Range is a mountain range in the Transantarctic Mountains of Antarctica. It is about 48 km (30 mi) long and 16 km (10 mi) wide, extending WSW-ENE from Eldridge Peak to Mirsky Ledge. The range forms the northeast end of the Horlick Mountains and consists primarily of a large snow-topped plateau with steep northern cliffs and several flat-topped ridges and mountains. The highest point is the summit of Mount Schopf (2990 m).

The range was surveyed in 1958-59 by the USARP Horlick Mountains Traverse, and was investigated in 1960-61 and 1961-62 by geologists of the Institute of Polar Studies of The Ohio State University, for which the range is named.

The central part of the range is occupied by the Buckeye Table, a plateau, 12 mi long and 2 to 5 mi wide.
The feature is a high level snow surface with precipitous northern cliffs; the plateau surface merges gradually with the inland ice to the south. The name, a nickname of the state of Ohio and Ohio State University, was proposed by William H. Chapman, U.S. Geological Survey (USGS) surveyor in these mountains in the 1958-59 season. Ohio State University and its Institute of Polar Studies initiated a program of geological investigation in the Ohio Range and the Horlick Mountains beginning in the 1960-61 season.


Features 
This range includes the following geographic features:
 Discovery Ridge A broad rock ridge with a rather flat summit area which projects NW from Buckeye Table two miles NW of Mount Glossopteris. The name was suggested by William E. Long, geologist of the Ohio State University expedition to the Horlick Mountains in 1960-61 and 1961-62. The first tillite and the first Devonian brachiopods were discovered by the expedition on this ridge, hence the name.
 Eldridge Peak A small, mainly ice-free peak, or nunatak, marking the west extremity of the range. Surveyed by the United States Antarctic Research Program (USARP) Horlick Mountains Traverse party in December 1958. Named by Advisory Committee on Antarctic Names (US-ACAN) for Henry M. Eldridge, Antarctic cartographer, Branch of Special Maps, U.S. Geological Survey.
 Mount Glossopteris –  A mainly ice-covered mountain which may be identified by the exposed horizontal bedding on the north face, located at the NE end of Buckeye Table. The name was proposed by USARP geologist William Long, a member of the Horlick Mountains Traverse party 1958-59, who, with Charles Bentley, Frederic Darling and Jack Long, climbed to the summit in December 1958. Glossopteris is a prehistoric fernlike plant whose imprint was found on rocks of this mountain. Museum Ledge is located on the southwest shoulder of Mount Glossopteris.
 Iversen Peak A peak 3 miles (4.8 km) east-northeast of Urbanak Peak at the northeast end of the range. Surveyed by the USARP Horlick Mountains Traverse party in December 1958. Named by US-ACAN for Frede Iversen, ionospheric physicist at Byrd Station in 1960.
 Mirsky Ledge A snow-covered ledge, or shelf-like feature, about  NE of Mount Schopf. Urbanak Peak and Iversen Peak rise above the ledge which is the apparent northeast extremity of the Horlick Mountains. The geology of these mountains was investigated by researchers from the Institute of Polar Studies, Ohio State University, 1958-62. The ledge was named by US-ACAN for Arthur Mirsky, Assistant Director of the Institute in that period.
 Quartz Pebble Hill A flat-topped elevation on the north escarpment of Buckeye Table. The hill is located where Discovery Ridge joins the main escarpment. The rock that forms the hill is composed of sandstone and quartz pebble conglomerate. The name was suggested by William E. Long, geologist of the Ohio State University expedition, who worked in these mountains in 1960-61 and 1961-62.
 Mount Schopf –  An elongated, mesa-like, mainly ice-covered mountain located just east of Buckeye Table. Surveyed by the USARP Horlick Mountains Traverse party in Dec. 1958. Named by US-ACAN for James M. Schopf, geologist, Coal and Geology Laboratory, U.S. Geological Survey (USGS), Columbus, Ohio, who greatly assisted the field geologist by analyzing coal and related rock specimens from this mountain. Schopf was a member of the Horlick Mountains Party in the 1961-62 season.
 Urbanak Peak A peak with exposed rock on the north side, situated along Mirsky Ledge. Surveyed by the USARP Horlick Mountains Traverse party in December 1958. Named by US-ACAN for Richard L. Urbanak, meteorologist at Byrd Station in 1960.

See also
Higgins Canyon
Otago Spur
Ricker Canyon
Skinner Peak
Terrace Ridge
Treves Butte

References

Transantarctic Mountains
Mountain ranges of Marie Byrd Land